Heinrich Sonnrein (28 March 1911 – 3 February 1944), nicknamed Heini, was a German footballer who played as a goalkeeper and made two appearances for the Germany national team.

Career
Sonnrein was the captain of FC Hanau 93, playing for the team between 1930 and 1942.

Sonnrein made his international debut for Germany on 15 September 1935 in a friendly match against Estonia, which finished as a 5–0 win in Stettin. He earned his second and final cap on 15 March 1936 in a friendly against Hungary, which finished as a 2–3 loss in Budapest.

Personal life
Sonnrein worked as a bank employee in Hanau, and was a hobby painter. He died in World War II, serving as a lieutenant in the German army, at the Battle of Monte Cassino on 3 February 1944 at the age of 32.

Career statistics

International

References

External links
 
 
 
 
 

1911 births
1944 deaths
Sportspeople from Hanau
Footballers from Hesse
German footballers
Germany international footballers
Association football goalkeepers
FC Hanau 93 players
German Army officers of World War II
German Army personnel killed in World War II
Military personnel from Hesse